The 1971 SCCA L&M Continental 5000 Championship was the fifth annual running of the Sports Car Club of America's professional open wheel racing series. Liggett & Myers increased it support of the championship for 1971 through its L&M cigarette brand and now had series naming rights.

The championship was won by David Hobbs, driving a McLaren M10B Chevrolet.

Calendar
The championship was contested over eight races with two heats per race.

Points system
Championship points were awarded to drivers on a 20-15-12-10-8-6-4-3-2-1 basis for the first ten places in each race, those places having been determined from the results of the two heats. Total points for each driver were based on the best six finishes.

Championship results

See also
 1971 Questor Grand Prix - Many Continental Championship competitors also raced in this non-championship race

References

External links
 Old Racing Cars Formula 5000 page

SCCA Continental Championship
Formula 5000
LandM Championship